William W. Wilshire (born William Wallace Wilshire; September 8, 1830 – August 19, 1888) was an American politician who served as the U.S. representative for  (1873–74 and 1875–77).

Biography
Born in Shawneetown, Illinois, Wilshire was educated in the country schools. He spent three years in California engaged in gold mining, from 1852 to 1855, when he returned to his home in Port Byron and engaged in the coal mining and mercantile business. He studied law and was admitted to the bar in 1859.

Wilshire entered the Union Army as major in the One Hundred and Twenty-sixth Regiment, Illinois Volunteer Infantry, and served from July 16, 1862. Following the Siege of Vicksburg, his regiment was sent to Arkansas and on the Little Rock Campaign under Major General Frederick Steele's force. He resigned July 16, 1864 because of health reasons.

After the war, he relocated to the capital city of Little Rock, Arkansas, and commenced the practice of law. He was appointed solicitor general of the state in 1867. From 1868 to 1871, he was chief justice of the Arkansas Supreme Court, leaving the position to resume his law practice.

The 1872 general election of Wilshire as a Republican Representative to the Forty-third U. S. Congress for the Third Congressional District was disputed by Democrat Thomas Gunter and, after a lengthy review by the Committee on Elections, Gunter was declared the winner and rightful occupant of the seat, ultimately taking the oath on June 16, 1874. 

Wilshire was elected as a Democrat to the Forty-fourth Congress (March 4, 1875 – March 3, 1877). He was not a candidate for renomination in 1876. He engaged in the practice of law in Washington, D.C., where he died August 19, 1888.

He was interred  at Mount Holly Cemetery in Little Rock.

Notes

References

1830 births
1888 deaths
People from Shawneetown, Illinois
Republican Party members of the United States House of Representatives from Arkansas
Democratic Party members of the United States House of Representatives from Arkansas
19th-century American politicians
Chief Justices of the Arkansas Supreme Court
People of Illinois in the American Civil War
Union Army officers
Burials at Mount Holly Cemetery
19th-century American judges